

Plants

Angiosperms

Conodonts

Archosauromorphs

Newly named pseudosuchians

Newly named dinosaurs 
Data courtesy of George Olshevsky's dinosaur genera list.

Newly named onithodirans

Newly named birds

Newly named pterosaurs

References

 
Paleontology
Paleontology 1